Castle Drogo is a country house and mixed-revivalist castle near Drewsteignton, Devon, England. Constructed between 1911 and 1930, it was the last castle to be built in England. The client was Julius Drewe, the hugely successful founder of the Home and Colonial Stores. Drewe chose the site in the belief that it formed part of the lands of his supposed medieval ancestor, Drogo de Teigne. The architect he chose to realise his dream was Edwin Lutyens, then at the height of his career. Lutyens lamented Drewe's determination to have a castle but nevertheless produced one of his finest buildings. The architectural critic Christopher Hussey described the result: "The ultimate justification of Drogo is that it does not pretend to be a castle. It is a castle, as a castle is built, of granite, on a mountain, in the twentieth century".

The castle was given to the National Trust in 1974, the first building constructed in the twentieth century that the Trust acquired. The castle is a Grade I listed building. The gardens are Grade II* listed on the National Register of Historic Parks and Gardens.

History

Born Drew, the son of George Smith Drew and his wife Mary, née Peek, both from substantial families of grocers, Drewe added the "e" to his surname later in life. At the age of 18, Drewe was sent to China as a tea-buyer by his uncle, Francis Peek (c.1836–99), a partner in Liverpool tea-merchants Peek and Winch. Julius's great uncle, Richard Peek (1782–1867), one of the three brothers who founded Peek and Winch, was an abolitionist and philanthropist who was on the organising committee of the anti-slavery conventions held in London in 1840 and 1843. The Peek and Winch company later expanded into coffee, cocoa, rubber and spices, and owned plantations in the Dutch East Indies. In 1878, Drewe returned to Liverpool and opened the Willow Pattern Tea Store. In 1883, Drewe and John Musker (1846–1926) founded the Home and Colonial Trading Association (later Home and Colonial Stores), which sold teas selected in India by Drewe, alongside other groceries. By 1903, the company had 500 stores. By the time of his death in 1931 he had bought up an estate of 1,500 acres. Around 1910 he asked Edwin Lutyens to build him a castle. According to his son Basil, he did so on the advice of Edward Hudson, proprietor of Country Life magazine, who was both a patron and a champion of Lutyens. Drewe was now 54 years old, but he still had time, energy and money to create his new family seat. The budget was £50,000 for the castle, and a further £10,000 for the garden. Lutyens wrote privately of his concern over Drewe's ambitions; "I do wish he didn't want a castle but just a delicious loveable house with plenty of good large rooms in it". On 4 April 1911, Drewe's 55th birthday, the first foundation stone was laid.

Construction
The castle took many years to complete, with the First World War and the economic downturn causing many delays. One reason for the slow progress was the very limited number of craftsmen used. The writer Christopher Hussey records that "after the first year, every stone was laid by two men alone...Devon masons Cleeve and Dewdney". As significant, was Drewe's waning enthusiasm; his son and heir Adrian was killed on 12 July 1917, in early skirmishes prior to the Battle of Passchendaele. Drewe's daughter later recalled, "after my brother's death...the joy of life went out as far as my father and mother were concerned...my father really was somewhat of an invalid afterwards. Overall responsibility for the construction work was held by Drewe's agent, John Coates Walker, described in the most recent guide to the castle as "the unsung hero of the whole venture". Castle Drogo was finally completed in 1930, roughly a third of the size of Lutyens's 1911 designs, and only a year before Julius died; he had, however, been able to live in the house since around 1925. The catalogue prepared for the 1981 exhibition at the Hayward Gallery on Lutyens' work describes Drogo as "one of his finest buildings". It was built at the same time as Lutyens's work in New Delhi, resulting in many similarities in design.

Later use
After Julius's death, his wife Frances and her son Basil continued to live at the castle. During 1939–45, Frances and her daughter Mary ran the house as a home for babies made homeless during the bombings of London. Frances Drewe died in 1954 and Basil was then joined at Drogo by his son Anthony and his wife. It was the first 20th-century property the charity acquired. The writer and National Trust administrator James Lees-Milne recorded his impressions of the house and its owners in a diary entry dated 9 September 1976; "Reached Castle Drogo ... at eleven. Very satisfactory house of clean-cut granite. A new family aspiring to, rather arriving at, landed gentry-hood and now the representative living upstairs in a tiny flat, all within my lifetime".

The castle has been undergoing an extensive, five-year restoration.  A new visitor centre with shop and café opened in the summer of 2009, after English Heritage required that industrial kitchen equipment such as that used by the previous café within the house, be removed from Grade I listed buildings. In February 2011, the National Trust launched a public appeal for money to fund necessary restoration work.

Architecture and description
Castle Drogo was the last castle to be built in England. As constructed, the castle represents approximately one third of the building Lutyens originally planned. The intended building would have run the entire length of the ridge, forming three sides of a large courtyard. The existing structure broadly represents the planned eastern wing of the whole. It was to have been matched by a corresponding wing to the west, the two joined by a northern block enclosing the planned great hall. Drewe balked at the costs, although his own decision to double the thickness of all of the walls on grounds of authenticity was a significant factor in their escalation. Pre-war, the plan for the western wing was abandoned, and after the end of hostilities, which had seen the death of Drewe's eldest son, plans for the great hall were also set aside, with the undercroft, which had been constructed, becoming the crypt chapel.

The castle borrows styles of castle building from the medieval and Tudor periods, along with more minimalist contemporary approaches. A notable feature is the encasement of the service staircase, around which the main staircase climbs. Its defensive characteristics are purely decorative. Additionally, the castle had electricity and lifts from the outset, with power being supplied by two turbines on the river below. The castle is a Grade I listed building.

Exterior
The castle essentially comprises a three-storey main block, with a four-storey family and service wing to the side.

Interior
The main block comprises four reception rooms, the hall, the library, the dining room and the drawing room.

Gardens
The castle has a formal garden, designed by Lutyens with planting by George Dillistone, which contrasts with its setting on the edge of Dartmoor. In 1915, Lutyens brought in Gertrude Jekyll to assist with the planning. Jekyll's involvement appears to have been limited to designing the planting for the approach to the castle along the drive. The garden is noted for its rhododendrons and magnolias, herbaceous borders, rose garden, shrub garden and circular grass tennis court now used for croquet. The gardens are Grade II* listed.

Notes

Sources

External links

Castle Drogo information at the National Trust

Houses completed in 1930
Drogo
Gardens in Devon
Grade I listed buildings in Devon
Grade I listed castles
Grade I listed houses
Grade II* listed parks and gardens in Devon
Country houses in Devon
National Trust properties in Devon
Mock castles in England
Edwardian architecture
Historic house museums in Devon
Works of Edwin Lutyens in England